Anjo de Mim is a Brazilian telenovela produced and broadcast at the time of 18 hours by TV Globo, September 9, 1996 to March 28, 1997 in 173 chapters (episodes).

Written by Walther Negrão, with collaboration of Elizabeth Jhin, Ângela Carneiro and Vinícius Vianna, counted on the direction of Ary Coslov, Roberto Naar, Edson Spinello and Alexandre Avancini and general direction and nucleus of Ricardo Waddington.

It counted with Tony Ramos, Helena Ranaldi, Herson Capri, Vivianne Pasmanter, Elias Gleizer, Paloma Duarte, Márcio Garcia, Françoise Forton, Milton Gonçalves, Cláudia Alencar, Otávio Augusto, Tássia Camargo and Carolina Kasting in the main roles.

Cast

Support cast

References

External links

1996 Brazilian television series debuts
1997 Brazilian television series endings
1996 telenovelas
TV Globo telenovelas
Brazilian telenovelas
Portuguese-language telenovelas
Telenovelas about spiritism